Mather is a given name. Notable people with the surname include:

 Mather Byles Almon (1796–1871) Canadian banker, politician, and philanthropist
 Mather Brown (1761–1831), portrait and historical painter
 Mather Byles (1706–1788), clergyman in British North America
 Mather Byles (loyalist) (1734/35–1814), clergyman, son of the above
 Mather Byles DesBrisay (1828–1900), Canadian lawyer, judge, politician, and historian

Adv Hashir Mather Anugraha Judges avenue Kaloor Ernakulam Kerala India